Pepperwood may refer to:
Pepperwood, an artist working in Switzerland
Pepperwood Resorts, different exclusive Private Resorts in Thailand e.g. Pepperwood Garden, Pepperwood Palms and Pepperwood Orchid
Zanthoxylum clava-herculis, American Pepperwood
Pseudowintera, New Zealand Pepperwood
Umbellularia californica
Pepperwood, California, a small town in the United States
Pepperwood, episode of season 2 of New Girl